Fifty Shades of Grey (Original Motion Picture Soundtrack) is the soundtrack to the film of the same name adapted from E. L. James's eponymous novel that was released through Republic Records on February 10, 2015. It was the seventh best-selling album of 2015 with 2.2 million copies sold worldwide.

Background
Meetings about the album took place nearly two years prior the album's release when plans of a film were announced. Mike Knobloch, president of film music and publishing at Universal said: "We really wanted the songs to be part of the fiber of the film — nothing crowbarred in or just auxiliary to the experience. There was a very deliberate effort to create as much original material as possible, to tailor the production, the lyrics, and the performance."

Beyoncé was one of the first singers approached for the film. Knobloch said: "She thought it was an opportunity to do something that aligned nicely with her brand and agenda." Sia was approached by Knobloch and music supervisor Dana Sano with a scene they had in mind: "It's a pivotal moment, when the two protagonists have an ecstatic and intimate first sexual encounter. [Sia] played us songs and we would say, 'That's good, but could it be more of this, or less of that?'. By the end we left her spinning her wheels about what she had to do to deliver just the right song to us for the film." The Weeknd was involved in the project very early. Tom Mackay, a manager at Republic Records, explained: "He worked on a number of songs for a number of scenes. Some were working and some weren't, but he just kept at it, and kept at it, and kept at it. In the end, he wrote 'Earned It' and it's the biggest song of his career to date. It's the only song that's in the movie twice."

On January 12, 2015, E. L. James announced the soundtrack would be released on February 10, 2015.

Singles
The soundtrack was preceded by the release of two singles. "Earned It", performed by the Weeknd, was released as the album's lead single on December 23, 2014, peaked at number three on the US Billboard Hot 100 and was included on his second album Beauty Behind the Madness. Ellie Goulding's "Love Me like You Do" was released as the second single on January 7, 2015; it reached number one on the national charts of 16 countries including the UK Singles Chart, and peaked at number three on the Hot 100 and was included on her third album Delirium.

Promotional singles
"Salted Wound" by Sia was released as the first promotional single on January 27, 2015. Two further promotional singles, "One Last Night" by Vaults and "I Know You" by Skylar Grey, were released on February 3, 2015. "I'm on Fire", a Bruce Springsteen cover performed by Awolnation, was released as the fourth promotional single on February 9, 2015.

Reception

Commercial performance 
The album debuted at number two on the Billboard 200 with sales of 258,000 units (210,000 copies of traditional albums) in its first week behind Drake's If You're Reading This It's Too Late. As of January 2017, it had sold 913,000 copies in the United States.

The album debuted at number two on the Canadian Albums Chart, selling 18,000 copies. As of July 2015, it had sold 89,000 copies in the country.

Critical reception 

In contrast to the near-universal panning of the film, its soundtrack has received generally favorable reviews from music critics. At Metacritic, which assigns a normalized rating out of 100 to reviews from mainstream critics, the soundtrack received an average score of 65, based on 7 reviews. Kenneth Partridge of Billboard rated the soundtrack three-and-a-half out of five stars, writing that the soundtrack "wisely skews mainstream". Chuck Arnold of Rolling Stone compared the soundtrack to those of The Twilight Saga and The Hunger Games while noting that the Weeknd's "Earned It" brings "Bond-theme drama" to the soundtrack. However, AllMusic's Stephen Thomas Erlewine described the soundtrack as "suitable for any romantic evening" and a seduction. Jim Farber of the New York Daily News claimed that the lyrics speak of "romanticized sex", while highlighting the album's "soft-edged production". Writing for ABC News, Allan Raible described the soundtrack as a collection of "sultry electro blues pop", but criticized the inclusions of older publications. Mikael Wood of the Los Angeles Times called the soundtrack a "slog" and criticized the album's midtempo tracks, while comparing the album's commercial performance to that of Taylor Swift's 1989.

Track listing 

Notes
 signifies a vocal producer
 signifies a remixer
 signifies a remixer and main producer
 signifies a co-producer
 "Crazy in Love (2014 Remix)" contains samples from "Are You My Woman (Tell Me So)", written by Eugene Record and performed by The Chi-Lites.

Credits
Credits for the soundtrack adapted from AllMusic.

Graham Archer - additional production, programming
AWOLNATION - primary artist, vocals
Ahmad Balshe - composer
Steve Bartek - orchestration
Jonathan Martin Berry - guitar
Beyoncé - featured artist, primary artist
Jay Bicknell - engineer, programming
Alison Bjorkedal - harp, instrumentation, programming
Simon Bloor - guitar, keyboards
Boots - composer, engineer, instrumentation, producer, remix producer, string arrangements, vocals (background)
Richard Brook - percussion
Sandy Brummels - art direction, package design
Aaron Bruno - instrumentation, mixing, primary artist, producer, programming
David Bukovinszky - cello
Paul Bushnell - bass
Mattias Bylund - editing, engineer, string arrangements, strings
Peter Carlsson - vocal editing, vocals (background)
Shawn Carter - composer
Dave Cavanaugh - producer
Michael Chaves - guitar, instrumentation, omnichord, programming
Adam Christgau - instrumentation, percussion, programming
Philip Cohen - music business affairs
Cy Coleman - composer
Martin Cooke - engineer
Jason Cooper - drums, instrumentation, programming
Rich Costey - mixing
Mike Dean - composer, drums, engineer, guitar, keyboards, mixing, producer, programming
Michael Diamond - remixing
Derek Dixie - mixing consultant
Gerald Eaton - composer
Danny Elfman - composer, primary artist, producer
Mike Fennel - engineer
Simon Finch - trumpet
Nicolas Fournier - engineer
Robin Fredriksson - vocals (background)
Vanessa Freebairn-Smith - cello
Barnabas Freeman - composer
Barney Freeman - producer, programming
Sia Furler - composer, instrumentation, programming, vocals
Brian Gardner - mastering
Serban Ghenea - mixing
Amanda Ghost - composer
Oscar Görres - vocals (background)
Ellie Goulding - primary artist, vocals
Skylar Grey - composer, featured artist, primary artist, vocals
John Hanes - engineer
Rich Harrison - composer
Jay Hawkins - composer
Emile Haynie - composer, producer
Dan Heath - producer
Justin Hergett - mixing assistant
Chris Hill - guitar (bass)
Hit-Boy - drum programming
Sam Holland - engineer
Oscar Holter - vocals (background)
Ivan Hussey - cello
Stephen Hussey - orchestration, viola, violin
Devonté Hynes - composer
Mick Jagger - composer, vocals, vocals (background)
Mattias Johansson - violin
Jessica Kelly - art direction, package design
Mike Knobloch - executive in charge of music
Beyoncé Knowles - composer, producer, vocal producer
Savan Kotecha - composer, vocals (background)
Oliver Kraus - cello, composer, instrumentation, producer, programming
James Krausse - mixing assistant
Mattias Larsson - vocals (background)
Carolyn Leigh - composer
Annie Lennox - featured artist, percussion, piano, primary artist, string arrangements, vocals
Rachel Levy - music supervisor
Tom MacKay - A&R
Blake Mares - assistant engineer
Margot - string arrangements
Andre Marsh - A&R
Max Martin - bass, composer, drums, keyboards, percussion, producer, programming, vocals (background)
Tony Maserati - mixing
Stephan Moccio - arranger, composer, keyboards, piano, producer, programming
Yoad Nevo - mixing
Tove Nilsson - composer
Evin O'Cleary - assistant engineer
Dave Okumu - composer, engineer, instrumentation, producer, programming
Ali Payami - bass, composer, drums, keyboards, percussion, producer, programming, vocals (background)
Blythe Pepino - composer, producer, programming
Jason "DaHeala" Queeneville - composer, engineer, producer, vocal engineer
Eugene Record - composer
Dave Reitzas - mixing
Keith Richards - composer, guitar, vocals, vocals (background)
Ramon Rivas - engineer, mixing assistant
Eric Robinson - engineer
Kate Robinson - violin
The Rolling Stones - featured artist, primary artist
Ilya Salmanzadeh - composer, vocals (background)
Dana Sano - soundtrack producer
Sia - featured artist, primary artist
Jo Silverston - cello
Frank Sinatra - primary artist, vocals
Noah Snyder - engineer, mixing
Ludvig Söderberg - vocals (background)
Bruce Springsteen - composer
Eric Stenman - engineer, mixing
Mike Stevens - guitar, keyboards, mixing, organ (hammond), programming, string arrangements
Jordan Stilwell - engineer
Rob Suchecki - assistant engineer
Patricia Sullivan - mastering
Sean Tallman - engineer
Abel Tesfaye - composer, vocals
Nicol Thomson - trombone
Urban Soul Orchestra - string engineer
Vaults - primary artist
Ben Vella - producer, programming
Benjamin Vella - composer
Jessica Ware - composer
Jessie Ware - primary artist, vocals
Charlie Watts - drums
The Weeknd - primary artist, vocals
Laura Welsh - composer, primary artist, vocals
Brian West - composer
Stuart White - engineer, mixing, vocal engineer
Neal Wilkinson - drums
Ron Wood - guitar, vocals, vocals (background)
Bill Wyman - guitar (bass)

Charts

Weekly charts

Year-end charts

Decade-end charts

Certifications

See also
 Danny Elfman discography

References

2015 soundtrack albums
Albums produced by Emile Haynie
Albums produced by Ilya Salmanzadeh
Albums produced by Max Martin
Albums produced by Mike Dean (record producer)
Fifty Shades film music
Republic Records soundtracks
Romance film soundtracks
Drama film soundtracks